WHJB is a classic hits radio station serving the Westmoreland County area, including eastern Allegheny County. The station is owned by St. Pier Group LLC, a subsidiary of Renda Broadcasting Corporation, and broadcasts at 107.1 MHz with an ERP of 2.3 KW.  WHJB is licensed to serve the community of Greensburg, Pennsylvania. Its transmitter is located in Unity Township, Pennsylvania.

History

The station began as WHJB-FM in 1968, sister station to then-WHJB (now WKHB), then became WOKU-FM, cycling through various formats (Adult Contemporary, Disco, Country and Heavy Metal) before becoming Top 40 WSSZ-FM "Hot Hits Z-107" in the late 1980s.

WSSZ switched to classic rock "Classic Hits Z-107" in July 1991.   In 1996, the station became a simulcast of WAMO-FM to cover the eastern part of the metro Pittsburgh market.  The simulcast was initiated as part of a sale of the FM station to Sheridan Broadcasting that year.

In 2003 WSSZ became a simulcast of WAMO after the 106.7 signal moved its tower and improved its coverage of Pittsburgh.  WSSZ, in turn, moved its tower further away from Pittsburgh to accommodate WAMO-FM's move.  In 2004, 107.1 acquired the WJJJ calls, and changed its name to "Majic 107.1," but the programming remained the same.

On January 30, 2006 Sheridan sold 107.1 to The St. Pier Group LLC (Renda Broadcasting), which changed the format to Variety Hits, using Westwood One's "SAM" satellite-delivered format and taking the call letters WGSM. The satellite format was eventually dropped.

In October 2009, the station applied for (and was granted) the call letters WHJB, and began using the callsign on February 8, 2010.

WHJB airs Westmoreland County high school football on Friday nights in the fall. Mike Zappone is the play-by-play announcer with Jimmy Lee Santorella assisting as color announcer.

References

External links
Classic Hits 107.1 Online

HJB
Radio stations established in 1968
Renda Broadcasting radio stations